Jérémy Denquin (born May 18, 1977 in Maubeuge) is a French professional footballer. He currently plays in the Championnat de France amateur for AS Yzeure.

Denquin played on the professional level in Ligue 1 for Lille OSC and in Ligue 2 for Lille OSC, Le Mans Union Club 72 and Clermont Foot.

External links
 
 

1977 births
Living people
French footballers
Ligue 1 players
Ligue 2 players
Lille OSC players
Le Mans FC players
Stade de Reims players
Clermont Foot players
Moulins Yzeure Foot players
Association football midfielders